Spectracanthicus zuanoni is a species of catfish in the family Loricariidae. It is native to South America, where it occurs in the Xingu River basin in the state of Pará in Brazil. It is usually found in areas up to 2 m (7 ft) deep with strong currents and rocky substrates, where it is often seen hiding beneath rocks. It is known to occur individually or in groups of three, with juveniles being found alongside other loricariid species, such as Ancistrus ranunculus, Baryancistrus xanthellus, Hopliancistrus tricornis, Parancistrus nudiventris, Peckoltia vittata, and its congener Spectracanthicus punctatissimus.

S. zuanoni is nocturnal, feeding actively on algae and periphyton at night. It reaches 12.9 cm (5.1 inches) SL, and its specific epithet, zuanoni, refers to Jansen Zuanon, the first ichthyologist to collect the species. S. zuanoni appears in the aquarium trade, where it is usually referred to either as the acari bola branca or by its associated L-number, which is L-020.

References 

Fish described in 2014
Loricariidae
Freshwater fish of Brazil